Kabuna is a village on Tabiteuea atoll in Kiribati. There are 202 residents of the village (2010 census). The nearest village is Taumwa to the north; and Tanaatoorua to the south. Apart from small breaks, the whole coastline from on the lagoon side is eroding as the result of wave action.

References

Populated places in Kiribati